Cylindera confluentesignata is a species of ground beetle of the subfamily Cicindelinae. It is found in countries such as Argentina, Brazil, Paraguay, and Uruguay.

References

confluentesignata
Beetles described in 1915
Taxa named by Walther Horn
Beetles of South America